The Hayden-Winkelman School District is located in southern Gila County, Arizona. The system has 420 students, in a high school, a middle school, and an elementary school. The Hayden-Winkelman School District Mascot is the lobos

References

External links
 Official Site

School districts in Gila County, Arizona
1936 establishments in Arizona
School districts established in 1936